Leverkusen is a city in North Rhine-Westphalia, Germany, on the eastern bank of the Rhine. To the south, Leverkusen borders the city of Cologne, and to the north the state capital, Düsseldorf.

With about 161,000 inhabitants, Leverkusen is one of the state's smaller cities. The city is known for the pharmaceutical company Bayer and its sports club Bayer 04 Leverkusen.

History 
The heart of what is now Leverkusen was Wiesdorf, a village on the Rhine, which dates back to the 12th century.  With the surrounding villages which have now been incorporated, the area also includes the rivers Wupper and Dhünn, and has suffered a lot from flooding, notably in 1571 and 1657, the latter resulting in Wiesdorf being moved East from the river to its present location.

During the Cologne War, from 1583 to 1588 Leverkusen was ravaged by war. The entire area was rural until the late 19th century, when industry prompted the development that led to the city of Leverkusen, and to its becoming one of the most important centres of the German chemical industry.

The chemist Carl Leverkus, looking for a place to build a dye factory, chose Wiesdorf in 1860. He built a factory for the production of artificial ultramarine blue at the Kahlberg in Wiesdorf in 1861, and called the emerging settlement "Leverkusen" after his family home in Lennep. The factory was taken over by the Bayer company in 1891; Bayer moved its headquarters to Wiesdorf in 1912. After asset confiscation at the end of the First World War, it became IG Farben. The city of Leverkusen proper was founded in 1930 by merging Wiesdorf, Schlebusch, Steinbüchel and Rheindorf, and was posthumously named for Carl Leverkus.

During the Second World War, the IG Farben factories were bombed by the RAF on 22 August 1943, again by the RAF during bombing campaigns on 19/20 November, the USAAF Eighth Air Force on 1 December 1943, and finally once again by the RAF on 10/11 December 1943.

In 1975, Opladen (including Quettingen and Lützenkirchen since 1930), Hitdorf and Bergisch Neukirchen joined Leverkusen. The present city is made up of former villages, originally called Wiesdorf, Opladen, Schlebusch, Manfort, Bürrig, Hitdorf, Quettingen, Lützenkirchen, Steinbüchel, Rheindorf and Bergisch-Neukirchen.

On 27 July 2021, an explosion at the Chempark site in the city killed 2 people and injured 31 others.

Demographics 
Population development since 1832:

Politics

Mayor 
The current Mayor of Leverkusen is Uwe Richrath of the Social Democratic Party (SPD), elected in 2015 and re-elected in 2020. The most recent mayoral election was held on 13 September 2020, with a runoff held on 27 September, and the results were as follows:

! rowspan=2 colspan=2| Candidate
! rowspan=2| Party
! colspan=2| First round
! colspan=2| Second round
|-
! Votes
! %
! Votes
! %
|-
| bgcolor=| 
| align=left| Uwe Richrath
| align=left| Social Democratic Party
| 28,016
| 46.1
| 29,438
| 70.0
|-
| bgcolor=| 
| align=left| Frank Schönberger
| align=left| Christian Democratic Union
| 14,198
| 23.4
| 12,619
| 30.0
|-
| bgcolor=| 
| align=left| Stefan Baake
| align=left| Alliance 90/The Greens
| 7,283
| 12.0
|-
| bgcolor=| 
| align=left| Roland Hartwig
| align=left| Alternative for Germany
| 3,132
| 5.2
|-
| 
| align=left| Karl Schweiger
| align=left| Citizens' List Leverkusen
| 3,070
| 5.1
|-
| bgcolor=| 
| align=left| Monika Ballin-Meyer-Ahrens
| align=left| Free Democratic Party
| 2,613
| 4.3
|-
| bgcolor=| 
| align=left| Christian Alexander Langer
| align=left| Die PARTEI
| 1,377
| 2.3
|-
| 
| align=left| Markus Beisicht
| align=left| Awakening Leverkusen
| 1,101
| 1.8
|-
! colspan=3| Valid votes
! 60,790
! 98.8
! 42,057
! 99.1
|-
! colspan=3| Invalid votes
! 744
! 1.2
! 362
! 0.9
|-
! colspan=3| Total
! 61,534
! 100.0
! 42,419
! 100.0
|-
! colspan=3| Electorate/voter turnout
! 126,846
! 48.5
! 126,801
! 33.5
|-
| colspan=7| Source: State Returning Officer
|}

City council 

The Leverkusen city council governs the city alongside the Mayor. The most recent city council election was held on 13 September 2020, and the results were as follows:

! colspan=2| Party
! Votes
! %
! +/-
! Seats
! +/-
|-
| bgcolor=| 
| align=left| Christian Democratic Union (CDU)
| 16,859
| 27.8
|  4.7
| 14
|  3
|-
| bgcolor=| 
| align=left| Social Democratic Party (SPD)
| 15,276
| 25.2
|  3.1
| 13
|  1
|-
| bgcolor=| 
| align=left| Alliance 90/The Greens (Grüne)
| 11,015
| 18.2
|  8.8
| 9
|  4
|-
| 
| align=left| Citizens' List Leverkusen (Bürgerliste)
| 3,630
| 6.0
|  1.0
| 3
|  1
|-
| 
| align=left| Opladen Plus (OP)
| 3,601
| 5.9
|  0.7
| 3
| ±0
|-
| bgcolor=| 
| align=left| Alternative for Germany (AfD)
| 3,466
| 5.7
| New
| 3
| New
|-
| bgcolor=| 
| align=left| Free Democratic Party (FDP)
| 2,937
| 4.8
|  1.0
| 3
|  1
|-
| bgcolor=| 
| align=left| The Left (Die Linke)
| 2,092
| 3.4
|  0.4
| 2
| ±0
|-
| 
| align=left| Citizens' Forum Green Leverkusen – Climate List (Büfo)
| 909
| 1.5
| New
| 1
| New
|-
| 
| align=left| Awakening Leverkusen (AUF)
| 876
| 1.4
| New
| 1
| New
|-
! colspan=2| Valid votes
! 60,661
! 98.6
! 
! 
! 
|-
! colspan=2| Invalid votes
! 866
! 1.4
! 
! 
! 
|-
! colspan=2| Total
! 61,527
! 100.0
! 
! 52
! ±0
|-
! colspan=2| Electorate/voter turnout
! 126,846
! 48.5
!  2.3
! 
! 
|-
| colspan=7| Source: State Returning Officer
|}

Coat of arms 
The coat of arms consists of the two-tailed rampant red lion of the Bergisches Land with a blue crown on a silver background and an embattled line in front.

Main sights and places of interest 

 BayArena is the home stadium of Bayer Leverkusen, with a capacity of over 30,000.
 The Bayer Cross Leverkusen is one of the largest illuminated advertisements in the world.
 Freudenthaler Sensenhammer is an industrial museum.
 Schloss Morsbroich – moated castle in the Baroque style, now a museum for contemporary art.
 Water Tower Leverkusen-Bürrig –  water reservoir containing an observation deck.
 Neuland Park – large park beside the Rhine.
 Japanese Garden – a 1913 garden extended by Carl Duisberg in 1923.
 Colony of workers – historical area in the form of houses and other buildings constructed for employees and families of the chemical works at the end of the 19th and beginning of 20th century.
 Einigkeit und Recht und Freiheit – historical boat bridge next to the Rhine, between Wiesdorf and Rheindorf.
 Mausoleum of Carl Duisberg – mausoleum in the centre of the Carl Duisberg Park, next to the Casino.
 NaturGut Ophoven – educational centre for nature in Leverkusen-Opladen.

Sports
The city is home of the football team Bayer 04 Leverkusen and the basketball team Bayer Giants Leverkusen, which is the German record holder of national basketball championships. As of 2019, the team plays in the German ProA league and plays its home games in the Ostermann-Arena.

The Ostermann-Arena, previously known as Wilhelm Dopatka Halle and Smidt-Arena, was one of the host arenas for the FIBA EuroBasket 1985 (the official European Basketball Championship).

Twin towns – sister cities

Leverkusen is twinned with:

 Oulu, Finland (1968)
 Bracknell, United Kingdom (1975)
 Ljubljana, Slovenia (1979)
 Nof HaGalil, Israel (1980)
 Chinandega, Nicaragua (1986)
 Schwedt, Germany (1989)
 Racibórz, Poland (2002)
 Villeneuve d'Ascq, France (2005)
 Wuxi, China (2014)

Notable people
Lothar Rohde (1906–1985), scientist and founder of Rohde & Schwarz Messtechnik
Heinrich Lützenkirchen (1909–1986), mayor of Leverkusen
Paul Janes (1912–1987), footballer
Wolf Vostell (1932–1988), sculptor, painter and happening artist
Ileana Jacket (born 1947), telenovela actress
Bärbel Dieckmann (born 1949), politician (SPD), mayor of Bonn 1994–2009
Wilfried Schmickler (born 1954), comedian
Andreas Hedwig (born 1959), archivist
Dietmar Mögenburg (born 1961), athlete
Detlef Schrempf (born 1963), basketball player
Sabine Moussier (born 1966), Mexican telenovela actress
Uta Briesewitz (born 1967), cinematographer
Ralf Schmitz (born 1974), actor and comedian
Jörg Bergmeister (born 1976), racing driver
Ji-In Cho (born 1976), heavy metal singer
Danny Ecker (born 1977), pole vaulter
Felix Sturm (born 1979), middleweight boxer
Thomas Fleßenkämper (born 1981), classical composer and pianist

References

Sources
 Blaschke, Stefan (1999): Unternehmen und Gemeinde: Das Bayerwerk im Raum Leverkusen 1891-1914 Cologne: SH-Verlag,  (German)
 Archive of Leverkusen (2005): Leverkusen. Geschichte einer Stadt am Rhein. Bielefeld: Verlag für Regionalgeschichte,  (German)
 Franz Gruß (1987): Geschichte und Porträt der Stadt Leverkusen. Leverkusen: Verlag Anna Gruß,  (German)

External links

 
 City of Leverkusen 

 
Populated places on the Rhine
1930 establishments in Germany
Populated places established in 1930